Valinor (Quenya: Land of the Valar) or the Blessed Realms is a fictional location in J. R. R. Tolkien's legendarium, the home of the immortal Valar on the continent of Aman, far to the west of Middle-earth; he used the name Aman mainly to mean Valinor. It included Eldamar, the land of the Elves, who as immortals were permitted to live in Valinor.

Aman was known somewhat misleadingly as "the Undying Lands", but the land itself does not cause mortals to live forever. However, only immortal beings were generally allowed to reside there. Exceptions were made for the surviving bearers of the One Ring: Bilbo and Frodo Baggins and Sam Gamgee, who dwelt there for a time, and the dwarf Gimli.

Scholars have described the similarity of Tolkien's myth of the attempt of Númenor to capture Aman to the biblical Tower of Babel and the ancient Greek Atlantis, and the resulting destruction in both cases. They note, too, that a mortal's stay in Valinor is only temporary, not conferring immortality, just as in Dante's Paradiso, the Earthly Paradise is only a preparation for the Celestial Paradise that is above.

Others have compared the account of the beautiful Elvish part of the Undying Lands to the Middle English poem Pearl, stating that the closest literary equivalents of Tolkien's descriptions of these lands are the imrama Celtic tales such as those about Saint Brendan from the early Middle Ages. The Christian theme of good and light (from Valinor) opposing evil and dark (from Mordor) has also been discussed.

Geography

Physical 

Valinor lies in Aman, a continent on the west of Belegaer, the ocean to the west of Middle-earth. Ekkaia, the encircling sea, surrounds both Aman and Middle-earth. Tolkien wrote that the name "Aman" was "chiefly used as the name of the land in which the Valar dwelt" [i.e. Valinor]. The land has a warm climate generally, though snow falls on the peaks of the Pelóri mountains, the highest being Taniquetil. Tolkien created no detailed maps of Aman; those drawn by Karen Wynn Fonstad, based on Tolkien's rough sketch of Arda's landmasses and seas, show Valinor about 800 miles wide, west to east (from the Great Sea to the Outer Sea), and about 3000 miles long north to south – similar in size to the United States. The entire continent of Aman runs from the Arctic latitudes of the Helcaraxë to the subarctic southern region of Middle-earth – about 7000 miles.

Eldamar is "Elvenhome", the "coastal region of Aman, settled by the Elves", wrote Tolkien. Eldamar was the true Eldarin name of Aman. In The Hobbit it is referred to as "Faerie". The land was well-wooded, as Finrod "walk[ed] with his father under the trees in Eldamar" and the Teleri had timber to build their ships. The city of the Teleri, on the north shore of the Bay is Alqualondë, the Haven of the Swans, whose halls and mansions are made of pearl. The harbour is entered through a natural arch of rock, and the beaches are strewn with gems given by the Noldor. In the bay is the island of Tol Eressëa.

Calacirya (Quenya: "Light Cleft", for the light of the Two Trees that streamed through the pass into the world beyond) is the pass in the Pelóri mountains where the Elven city Tirion was set. After the hiding of Valinor, this was the only gap through the mountains of Aman. The Valar would have closed the mountains entirely but, realizing that the Elves needed to be able to breathe the outside air, they kept Calacirya open. They also did not want to wholly separate the Vanyar and Noldor from the Teleri on the coast.

The city of the Noldor (and for a time the Vanyar also) is Tirion, which was built on the hill of Túna, raised inside the Calacirya mountain pass, just north of Taniquetil, facing both the Two Trees and the starlit seas. The city had a central square at the top of the hill and a tower called the Mindon Eldaliéva, a beacon visible from the seashore miles to the east. 

In the extreme north-east, beyond the Pelóri, was the Helcaraxë, a vast ice sheet that joined the two continents of Aman and Middle-earth before the War of Wrath. 
To prevent anyone from reaching the main part of Valinor's east coast by sea, the Valar created the Shadowy Seas, and within these seas they set a long chain of islands called the Enchanted Isles.

Political 

Valinor is the home of the Valar (singular Vala), spirits that often take humanoid form, sometimes called "gods" by the Men of Middle-earth. Other residents of Valinor include the related but less powerful spirits, the Maiar, and most of the Eldar. 

Each Vala has his or her own region of the land. The Mansions of Manwë and Varda, two of the most powerful spirits, stood upon Taniquetil, the highest mountain of the Pelóri. Yavanna, the Vala of Earth, Growth, and Harvest, resided in the Pastures of Yavanna in the south of the land, west of the Pelóri. Near-by were the mansions of Yavanna's spouse, Aulë the Smith, who made the Dwarves. Oromë, the Vala of the Hunt, lived in the Woods of Oromë to the north-east of the pastures. Nienna, the lonely Vala of Sorrow and Endurance, lived in the far west of the island where she spent her days crying about all the evil of the world, looking out to sea. Just south of Nienna's home, and to the north of the pastures, were the Halls of Mandos. Mandos was the Vala of the After-life. Also living in the Halls of Mandos was his spouse Vairë the weaver, who weaves the threads of time. To the east of the Halls of Mandos is the Isle of Estë, which is situated in the middle of the lake of Lórellin, which in turn lies to the north of the Gardens of Lórien.

In east-central Valinor at the Girdle of Arda (the Equator of Tolkien's world) is Valmar, the capital of Valinor (also called Valimar or the City of Bells), the residence of the Valar and the Maiar in Valinor. The first house of the Elves, the Vanyar, settled there as well. The mound of Ezellohar, on which stood the Two Trees, and Máhanaxar, the Ring of Doom, are outside Valmar. Farther east is the Calacirya, the only easy pass through the Pelóri, a huge mountain range fencing Valinor on three sides, created to keep Morgoth's forces out. In the pass is the city Tirion, built on a hill, the city of the Noldor Elves.

In the northern inner foothills of the Pelóri, hundreds of miles north of Valmar, was Fëanor's city of Formenos, built upon his banishment from Tirion.

History

Years of the Trees

Valinor was established on the western continent Aman when Melkor (a Vala later named Morgoth, "the black foe", by the Elves) destroyed the Valar's original home on the island Almaren in primeval Middle-earth, ending the Years of the Lamps. To defend their new home from attack, they raised the Pelóri Mountains. They also established Valimar, the radiant Two Trees, and their dwelling-places. Valinor was said to have surpassed Almaren in beauty. Later, the Valar heard of the awakening of the Elves in Middle-earth, where Melkor was unopposed. They proposed to bring the Elves to the safety of Valinor, but to do that, they needed to get Melkor out of the way. A war was fought, and Melkor's stronghold Utumno was destroyed. Then, many Elves came to Valinor, and established their cities Tirion and Alqualondë, beginning Valinor's age of glory. But Melkor had come back to Valinor as a prisoner, and after three Ages was brought before the Valar and he sued for pardon, vowing to assist the Valar and make amends for the hurts he had done. Manwë granted him pardon, but confined him within Valmar to remain under watch. After his release, Melkor started planting seeds of dissent in the minds of the Elves, including between Fëanor and his brothers Fingolfin and Finarfin.

The Darkening of Valinor

Belatedly, the Valar learned what Melkor had done. Knowing that he was discovered, Melkor went to the home of the Noldorin elves' High King Finwë, killed him and stole the prized jewels, the Silmarils. He then destroyed the Two Trees with the help of Ungoliant, plunging Valinor into darkness, the Long Night, relieved only by stars. Melkor and Ungoliant fled to Middle-earth.

The Hiding of Valinor

The Valar managed to save one last luminous flower from Telperion, and one last luminous fruit from Laurelin. These became the Moon and the Sun. The Valar carried out further titanic labours to improve the defences of Valinor. They raised the Pelóri mountains to even greater and sheerer heights. Off the coast, eastwards of Tol Eressëa, they created the Shadowy Seas and their Enchanted Isles; both the Seas and the Isles presented numerous perils to anyone attempting to get to Valinor by sea.

Later history

For centuries Valinor took no part in the struggles between the Noldor and Morgoth in Middle-earth. But near the end of the First Age, when the Noldor were in total defeat, the mariner Eärendil convinced the Valar to make a last attack on Morgoth. A mighty host of Maiar, Vanyar and the remaining Noldor in Valinor destroyed Morgoth's gigantic army and his stronghold Angband, and cast Morgoth into the void.

During the Second Age, the Valar created the island of Númenor as a reward to the Edain, Men who had fought alongside the Noldor. Centuries later the kingdom of Númenor grew so powerful and so arrogant that Ar-Pharazôn, the twenty-fifth and last king, dared to attempt an invasion of Valinor. When Eru Ilúvatar was called upon by the Valar, Númenor sank into the sea, and Aman was removed beyond the reach of the Men of Arda. Arda itself became spherical, and was left for Men to govern. The Elves could go there only by the Straight Road and in ships capable of passing out of the spheres of the earth.

Analysis

Paradise

Keith Kelly and Michael Livingston, writing in Mythlore, note that Frodo's final destination is Aman, the Undying Lands. In Tolkien's mythology, they write, the islands of Aman were initially just the dwelling-places of the Valar (in the Ages of the Trees, while the rest of the world lay in darkness) who helped The One, Eru Iluvatar, to create the world, but gradually some of the immortal and ageless Elves were allowed to live there as well, sailing across the ocean to the West. After the fall of Númenor and the reshaping of the world, Aman becomes the place "between (sic) Over-heaven and Middle-earth", accessible only in special circumstances like Frodo's, allowed to come to Aman through the offices of the Valar and of Gandalf, one of the Valar's emissaries, the Maiar. However, Aman is not, they write, exactly paradise: firstly, being there does not confer immortality, contrary to what the Númenoreans supposed; and secondly, those mortals like Frodo who are allowed to go there will eventually choose to die. They note that in another of Tolkien's writings, Leaf by Niggle, understood to be a journey through Purgatory (the Catholic precursor stage to paradise), Tolkien avoids describing paradise at all; they suggest that to the Catholic Tolkien, it is impossible to describe Heaven, and it might be sacrilege to make the attempt. The Tolkien scholar Michael D. C. Drout comments that Tolkien's accounts of Eldamar "give us a good idea of his conceptions of absolute beauty," and notes that these resemble the paradise described in the Middle English poem Pearl. 

The Tolkien scholar Tom Shippey adds that in 1927 Tolkien wrote a poem, The Nameless Land, in the complex stanza-form of Pearl which spoke of a land further away than paradise, and more beautiful than the Irish Tir nan Og, the deathless otherworld. Kelly and Livingston similarly draw on Pearl, noting that it states that "fair as was the hither shore, far lovelier was the further land" where the Dreamer could not pass. So, they write, each stage looks like paradise, until the traveller realises that beyond it lies something even more paradisiacal, glimpsed and beyond description. The Earthly Paradise can be described; Aman, the Undying Lands, can thus be compared to the Garden of Eden, the paradise that the Bible says once existed upon Earth before the Fall of Man, while the Celestial Paradise lies "beyond (or above)", as it does, they note, in Dante's Paradiso.

Good against evil

The scholar of English literature Marjorie Burns writes that one of the female Vala, Varda (Elbereth to the Elves) is sung to by the Elf-queen of Middle-earth Galadriel. Burns notes that Varda "sits far off in Valinor on Oiolossë", looking from her mountain-peak tower in Aman towards Middle-earth and the Dark Tower of Sauron in Mordor: in her view, the white benevolent feminine symbol opposing the evil masculine symbol. Further, Burns suggests, Galadriel is an Elf from Valinor "in the Blessed Realm", bringing Varda's influence with her to Middle-earth. This is seen in the phial of light that she gives to Frodo, and that Sam uses to defeat the evil giant spider Shelob: Sam invokes Elbereth when he uses the phial. Burns comments that Sam's request to the "Lady" sounds distinctly Catholic, and that the "female principle, embodied in Varda of Valinor and Galadriel of Middle-earth, most clearly represents the charitable Christian heart."

Atlantis, Babel

Kelly and Livingston state that while Aman could be home to Elves as well as Valar, the same was not true of mortal Men. The "prideful" Men of Númenor, imagining they could acquire immortality by capturing the physical lands of Aman, were punished by the destruction of their own island, which is engulfed by the sea, and the permanent removal of Aman "from the circles of the world". Kelly and Livingston note the similarity to the ancient Greek myth of Atlantis, the greatest human civilisation lost beneath the sea; and the resemblance to the biblical tale of the Tower of Babel, the hubristic and "sacrilegious" attempt by mortal men to climb up into God's realm.

Celtic influence

The scholar of English literature Paul H. Kocher writes that the Undying Lands of the Uttermost West including Eldamar and Valinor, is "so far outside our experience that Tolkien can only ask us to take it completely on faith." Kocher comments that these lands have an integral place both geographically and spiritually in Middle-earth, and that their closest literary equivalents are the imrama Celtic tales from the early Middle Ages. The imrama tales describe how Irish adventurers such as Saint Brendan sailed the seas looking for the "Land of Promise". He notes that it is certain that Tolkien knew these stories, since in 1955 he wrote a poem, entitled Imram, about Brendan's voyage.

See also

 Asgard, a similar location in Norse mythology
 Álfheimr, another similar location in Norse mythology
 Elysium and Mount Olympus from Greek Mythology
 In Celtic accounts: Mag Mell, Tír na nÓg

Notes

References

Primary
This list identifies each item's location in Tolkien's writings.

Secondary

Sources 

 
 
 
 
  
 
 
 
 
 
 
 
 

Middle-earth realms
Fictional continents
Fiction about the afterlife

pl:Aman (Śródziemie)#Valinor